Monroe Hickson (July 8, 1908 – December 29, 1967), also known as Willie Tyler, nicknamed Bluecorns, was an American serial killer who murdered four shopkeepers in Aiken County, South Carolina, during a crime spree spanning between April and September 1946. Hickson was not suspected in the murders until 1957, when he was jailed for attempted murder. Before his arrest, another man was wrongfully convicted for two of the murders.

Early life 
Monroe Hickson was born on July 8, 1908, in Aiken County, South Carolina. Hickson, although lacking a formal education, was said to have been very intelligent, and was an avid reader of the Bible, regularly carrying one with him. Hickson was convicted of his first crime in 1931, which was assault with intent to kill. He was sentenced to five years in prison and released early in 1933. In 1937, Hickson was convicted of burglary and larceny and sentenced to one year in prison.

Murders 
Hickson is known to have committed his first murder on April 17, 1946, when he fatally shot David Garrett at Garrett's shop in Aiken. Afterwards, he robbed the place and stole a pistol. 11 days later, on April 28, Hickson killed Edward and Mary Bennett, a married couple who were working at the grocery store they owned. Before he died, Edward exclaimed to police "A big negro shot me and robbed me". The three murders, which took place in a short amount to time, were quickly connected and a $2,500 reward was published for any information leading to an arrest.

On September, 28, Hickson attacked Annie Wiseburg at her home, where he stabbed and bludgeoned her to death. In October, Hickson struck again, this time attacking a female liquor store clerk with a brick, however, she survived. He was arrested shortly after the last attack, but was not linked to the previous crimes, and was sentenced to 20 years imprisonment.

Wrongful conviction of L.D. Harris 
During the investigation of the Bennett slayings, police were notified about L.D. Harris, who had left town for Nashville, Tennessee shortly after the murders. Harris, who was illiterate, was questioned without a lawyer, in which he confessed. In January 1947, Harris' case went to trial. His defense claimed that besides the confession, which they claimed was the result of pressure from higher authority, no other evidence linked Harris to the crime.

Nevertheless, the jury found Harris guilty on all counts, and he was sentenced to death. His lawyers attempted to appeal his sentence by contacting the Supreme Court of South Carolina, but they found no basis that his confession was involuntary. In 1948, Harris appealed to the United States Supreme Court, and they noted several factors that made his confession involuntary; Harris had not been informed of his rights under South Carolina law, had no access to family or friends, and the persistence of the authorities. As such of this, in June 1949, the Supreme Court voted 5–4 in favor that Harris' sentence should be reversed. Afterwards, Harris was released from prison.

Capture and escape 
On August 8, 1957, Hickson was arrested after perpetrating another violent assault, in which he attempted to kill Lucy Hill Parker, leaving her with a serious head injury. In the subsequent interrogation, Sheriff Wyman Busch questioned Hickson about other crimes, after noticing patterns in Hickson's movements to unsolved murders in the area. After this, Hickson confessed to having perpetrated four murders in the Aiken area in 1946, but claimed he was drunk each time he committed the crimes. Because of this, Hickson was forced in four consecutive life sentences for each of the murders. 

On March 10, 1966, Hickson escaped Manning Correctional Institution in Columbia, South Carolina, where he had been serving his sentences. A federal warrant was issued the following month, but with no leads in sight, Hickson was added to the FBI Ten Most Wanted Fugitives list on February 17, 1967. In 1968, a couple from Chapel Hill, North Carolina came forward with information, after identifying Hickson to a migrant farm worker named Willie Tyler who had died on December 29. A positive identification was later made via fingerprinting.

See also 
 List of serial killers in the United States
 FBI Ten Most Wanted Fugitives by year, 1967

References

External links 
 HARRIS v. STATE OF SOUTH CAROLINA

1908 births
1967 deaths
20th-century American criminals
20th-century African-American people
African-American people
American people convicted of murder
American prisoners sentenced to life imprisonment
American serial killers
Criminals from South Carolina
FBI Ten Most Wanted Fugitives
Fugitives
Male serial killers
People convicted of murder by South Carolina
Prisoners sentenced to life imprisonment by South Carolina
American escapees
Escapees from South Carolina detention